Liu Jingsong (born July 1933) is a general (shangjiang) of the People's Liberation Army (PLA). He was a member of the 12th, 13th, 14th and 15th Central Committee of the Chinese Communist Party.

Biography 
He secondary studied at Shishou High School. He enlisted in the People's Liberation Army (PLA) in July 1951, and joined the Chinese Communist Party (CCP) in 1954. He graduated from the PLA 7th Infantry School. As a result of his performance at the Vietnam War, he was eventually promoted to commander of a PLA army in 1983. In the war, he shot down and injured 12 American fighter planes. 

In 1985, he was appointed commander of the Shenyang Military Region, he remained in that position until November 1992, when he was transferred to Lanzhou Military Region and appointed commander. He became president of the PLA Academy of Military Science in November 1997, and served until his retirement in December 1998. During his tenure in 1987, he commanded the troops to put out the forest fire in Daxinganling.

He was promoted to the rank of lieutenant general (zhongjiang) in 1988 and general (shangjiang) in 1994.

Publication

References 

1933 births
Living people
People from Shishou
People's Liberation Army generals from Hubei
People's Republic of China politicians from Hubei
Chinese Communist Party politicians from Hubei
Commanders of the Shenyang Military Region
Commanders of the Lanzhou Military Region
Members of the 12th Central Committee of the Chinese Communist Party
Members of the 13th Central Committee of the Chinese Communist Party
Members of the 14th Central Committee of the Chinese Communist Party
Members of the 15th Central Committee of the Chinese Communist Party